Jalal Baba Auditorium is a public auditorium in Abbottabad, Khyber Pakhtunkhwa, Pakistan.

History
The auditorium was named after Muhammad Jalal-ud-din Jalal Baba. Khan was a respected leader of All India Muslim League and minister from Abbottabad at the time of the Partition of India in 1947. It was constructed in 1993, and consists of a large hall, performers' waiting room, and VIP rooms. It has the capacity to seat between 500 and 700 people.

The auditorium has held exhibitions, concert events, public meetings, conferences and numerous other activities. It is also used for a Karate club. It also houses a National Book Foundation (Pakistan) centre, Abbasin Arts Council and Abbottabad Development Authority offices.

References

Abbottabad District
1993 establishments in Pakistan
Auditoriums in Pakistan
Buildings and structures in Abbottabad
Music venues in Pakistan